The football sporting event at the 1915 Far Eastern Championship Games was a  two legged match between China and the Philippines. The Chinese football club, South China A.A. represented the Chinese side having won the right to do so after winning against Nanyang and Canton. The first match ended with a draw in which both sides saw one player being sent off and the second match was won by China 1–0. It was reported that the second match also ended in a 1–1 draw, but this is likely due to a confusion with the semifinal at the extra tournament. An extra tournament was also held between the Philippines, South China A.A., Nanyang and Shanghai Britons which was won by the Shanghai Britons.

Results

Both teams had one player sent off

Winner

Statistics

Goalscorers

Extra Tournament

Semifinals

Final

References

1915 in Chinese sport
Football at the Far Eastern Championship Games
1915
1915 in Asian football